Pacione is an Italian surname. Notable people with the surname include:

Emilio Pacione (1920–2012), Scottish footballer
Marco Pacione (born 1963), Italian footballer
Makena Pacione (1999-2023), American footballer

Italian-language surnames